Ora (lit. Radiance) is a moshav in central Israel. Located southwest of Jerusalem, it falls under the jurisdiction of Mateh Yehuda Regional Council.

History
The village was established in 1950 by Jews from Yemen on land that had belonged to the depopulated Palestinian  village of al-Jura. The name "Ora" was taken from the Book of Esther 8:16: "For the Jews it was (a time of) radiance." The residents initially lived in tents and by 1954 only thirteen families remained. In 1953 Percy Newman, a British Jewish industrialist, donated money to the Jewish National Fund for the purchase of 3,000 dunams for the moshav. Several North African Jews later joined the moshav.

Residents were given tracts of land allocated for poultry farming and continued to live in tents, without running water or electricity, until 1957. Before the establishment of Kiryat HaYovel, the closest neighborhood was Beit VeGan, which was reached on foot or by donkey.

In the 1990s, after the wave of Russian immigration to Israel, the moshav increased egg production from 300 million to 500 million eggs a year.

References

Moshavim
Populated places established in 1950
Populated places in Jerusalem District
Yemeni-Jewish culture in Israel
1950 establishments in Israel